Hoang Anh Gia Lai is the name of:
 Hoang Anh Gia Lai Group, Vietnamese company
 CLB Hoàng Anh Gia Lai, football club in Vietnam